Prescombe Down is a biological Site of Special Scientific Interest in Wiltshire, notified in 1951.

Sources
 English Nature citation sheet for the site (accessed 14 August 2006)

External links
 English Nature website (SSSI information)

Sites of Special Scientific Interest in Wiltshire
Sites of Special Scientific Interest notified in 1951
Special Areas of Conservation in England